Tobias Koch may refer to:
 Tobias Koch (pianist)
 Tobias Koch (footballer)

See also
 Tobias Köck, German political and cultural scientist